Nordischer Klang (English: Nordic Sound) is the largest festival of Nordic culture in Germany. It is a major platform for artists from Denmark, Finland, Iceland, Norway, and Sweden in Germany. The festival takes place in the town of Greifswald, which is situated about 200 km to the north of Germany's capital Berlin at the Baltic shore.

Nordischer Klang is organised by a non-profit society loosely associated with the Department of Nordic Studies at the University of Greifswald.

History 
The festival began in 1992 and has since then taken place every year. A wide range of activities is offered every year, covering the whole spectrum of culture in the form of live performances, exhibitions, shows, lectures and courses, e.g. about film, theatre, literature, social developments, comedy, and different types of music.

The festival is usually under the patronage of one politician from Germany and one from the Nordic countries.

2007
The 16th festival in 2007 was under the aegis of Harald Ringstorff (then governor of Mecklenburg-Vorpommern) and the Minister of Culture of Denmark.

2008 
The 17th festival took place from 2 to 9 May under the patronage of Thorgerdur Katrín Gunnarsdóttir (Minister of Culture of Iceland). Among the performing guests were the Scandinavian Jazz stars Viktoria Tolstoy and LaGaylia Frazier.

2009
The 18th festival from 2 to 9 May was under the aegis of Erwin Sellering (the governor of Mecklenburg-Vorpommern) and Alexander Stubb (Minister of Foreign of Finland).
Headliners were the Finnish singer Johanna Iivanainen, who played together with the saxophonist Eero Koivistoinen auftrat, the Marilyn Mazur Group and the sami singer Sofia Jannok. There were also different comic-exhibitions, amongst others drawings by Steffen Kverneland.

2010
The 19th festival took place from 6 to 15 May. It was under the patronage of Norway and Erwin Sellering (the governor of Mecklenburg-Vorpommern) and Alexander Stubb (Minister of Foreign of Finland).
Highlights were the concerts of the Danish progressive/rock-band The Savage Rose, the Swedish entertainer Sylvia Vrethammar and the Valkyrien Allstars, a folk/pop-group from Norway.

2011
In 2011 the Nordischer Klang celebrated its 20th birthday from 5 to 15 May. Lena Adelsohn Liljeroth the Swedish Minister of Culture had the patronage.
Great acts were the Elin Larsson Group (S), the Jan Lundgren Trio & LaGaylia (S/USA; Special guest: Lars Danielsson), a Danish pop-night with the bands Bird and Catbird, the Finnish Wimme Saari Group  and the event "Universum"  (universe) from Per Kirkeby.

2012
Under the motto "mächtig gewaltig" (mighty giant) the 21st Nordische Klang took place from 3 to 14 May under the patronage of Denmark's  Minister of Culture Uffe Elbæk together with the Governor of Mecklenburg-Vorpommern Erwin Sellering.
The Olsen Gang was in town, when Morten Grunwald alias Benny, the last living actor of the criminal trio, who showed together with the MDR-presenter Janine Strahl-Oesterreich a new Biographie of the Egon-actor Ove Sprogøe. Musical highlights were the Swedish jazz-trombonist Nils Landgren together with the NDR Bigband, the Polish-Danish pop group Czesław Śpiewa, the Norwegian EstherOrkester and the finish band The Irrationals. Even the founder of the avant-garde jazz in the former Soviet Union Wjatscheslaw Ganelin came to the festival with his trio Priority.

2013
Under the patronage of Iceland too the 22nd Nordischer Klang took place from 2 to 13 May. It was opened with the performance by the Icelandic artist Anna María Björnsdóttir. A special was a music video, which was produced for Greifswald. Kitty Von-Sometime made it with her Weird Girls Project. 14 young women were filmed in crazy costumes in Greifswald. Other highlights were the indie-night with Møll from Norway and Tilbury from Iceland, the Finnish pop-group Popband Mariska & Pahat Sudet and the debut of the blues singer Jes Holtsøs alias Börge, a former actor of the Olsen gang.

Sponsors
The embassies of Denmark, Finland, Norway, and Sweden in Berlin as well as the city of Greifswald, the University of Greifswald and the state of Mecklenburg-Vorpommern give moral and financial support. Other major supporters are:
 Nordic Council of Ministers
 Danish Ministry of Science, Technology and Development
 Finland Institute, Swedish Institute 
 Municipality of Kotka, Finland 
 Kultur och Fritid, Lund, Schweden 
 Danish Jazz Association 
 Alfried Krupp von Bohlen und Halbach Foundation
 German-Finnic Society; German-Lithuanian Society 
 Society of Friends and Benefactors of the University of Greifswald 
 Sparkasse Vorpommern Foundation, Theater Vorpommern

External links
 Nordischer Klang
 moritzTV (student channel) video of Nordischer Klang 2006

Greifswald
University of Greifswald
Events in Mecklenburg-Western Pomerania
Music in Mecklenburg-Western Pomerania
Folk festivals in Germany
Music festivals established in 1992
Spring (season) events in Germany